Kenyan Drake (born January 26, 1994) is an American football running back who is a free agent. He played college football at Alabama. Drake was drafted by the Miami Dolphins in the third round of the 2016 NFL Draft.

Early years
Drake attended Hillgrove High School in Powder Springs, Georgia. He played football at Hillgrove. As a senior, he rushed for 1,610 yards with 18 touchdowns and was named the Gatorade Football Player of the Year for Georgia. He was rated as a four-star recruit by Rivals.com. He received offers from Alabama, Georgia, and Georgia Tech. He committed to the University of Alabama to play college football.

College career
Drake attended and played college football for the University of Alabama from 2012–2015 under head coach Nick Saban.

As a true freshman in 2012, Drake played in 12 games as a backup to Eddie Lacy and T. J. Yeldon. On September 8, against Western Kentucky, he had a 32-yard rushing touchdown. Overall, in the 2012 season, he rushed for 281 yards on 42 carries with five touchdowns.

As a sophomore in 2013, Drake appeared in 11 games with one start as the backup to Yeldon. On September 28, against Ole Miss, he had 99 rushing yards and a rushing touchdown. On October 12, against Kentucky, he had 106 rushing yards, two rushing touchdowns, and three receptions for 44 yards. He followed that up with 104 rushing yards and two rushing touchdowns against Arkansas. He rushed for 694 yards on 92 carries with eight touchdowns and had 12 receptions for 135 yards and a touchdown.

In 2014, Drake played in only five games his junior year due to a broken leg suffered against Ole Miss on October 4.

Drake returned from the injury for his senior year in 2015. As a backup to Derrick Henry, he played in 13 games, missing two due to a broken arm. In the season opener against Wisconsin, he had 77 rushing yards, one rushing touchdown, and 48 receiving yards. In the next game, against Middle Tennessee State, he had 40 rushing yards, 91 receiving yards, and a receiving touchdown.   Overall, Drake rushed for 408 yards on 77 carries with one touchdown and had 29 receptions for 276 yards and a touchdown. During Alabama's 45–40 win over Clemson in the 2016 College Football Playoff National Championship, he returned a kickoff 95 yards for a touchdown in the fourth quarter.

Collegiate statistics

Professional career

Miami Dolphins
Drake was drafted by the Miami Dolphins in the third round, 73rd overall, in the 2016 NFL Draft. He was the third running back to be selected that year.

2016 season
Drake made his NFL debut in the 12–10 loss to the Seattle Seahawks at CenturyLink Field in the season opener. In the next game, against the New England Patriots, he scored his first professional rushing touchdown on a seven-yard rush in the fourth quarter. On November 6, against the New York Jets, he had 96-yard kickoff return for a touchdown in the 27–23 victory. He played in all 16 games as a rookie, rushing for 179 yards and two touchdowns.

2017 season
After starting running back Jay Ajayi was traded to the Philadelphia Eagles in 2017 for a fourth round pick, Drake was named the second running back behind Damien Williams for Miami after entering the season third on the depth chart. After an injury to Williams in Week 12, Drake was named the starting running back. In Week 13, he rushed for a season-high 120 yards and a touchdown in a 35–9 win over the Denver Broncos. In Week 14, he totaled 193 yards from scrimmage against the New England Patriots, playing an integral part in the Dolphins' 27–20 upset win. In the aftermath of a scuffle against the Buffalo Bills in Week 17 in which he grabbed and tossed a Bills player's helmet, Drake and teammate Jarvis Landry were ejected from the game. Drake finished the season with 644 yards on the ground and three touchdowns with six starts.

2018 season
Through the first six games of the Dolphins' 2018 season, Drake had 210 rushing yards and one rushing touchdown to go with 21 receptions for 145 receiving yards and a receiving touchdown. In Week 8, he recorded a rushing and a receiving touchdown in the loss to the Houston Texans'. In Week 14 against the New England Patriots, Drake was part of the Miracle in Miami. Trailing by five points with seven seconds to go, the Dolphins had the ball at their own 31-yard line. Quarterback Ryan Tannehill threw a pass over the middle that was caught by wide receiver Kenny Stills, who lateraled the ball to the right side of the field that was caught by DeVante Parker at midfield. Parker lateraled the ball to Drake, who ran the ball 52 yards for a touchdown to win the game 34–33. Overall, he finished the 2018 season with 535 rushing yards and four rushing touchdowns to go along with 53 receptions for 477 receiving yards and five receiving touchdowns. This would be his last full season in Miami, as he was traded to the Arizona Cardinals at the trade deadline.

2019 season
In six games with the Dolphins in the 2019 season, Drake recorded 47 carries for 174 rushing yards and 22 receptions for 174 receiving yards.

Arizona Cardinals

2019 season
On October 28, 2019, Drake was traded to the Arizona Cardinals for a conditional sixth-round pick, which became Miami's original fifth-round pick in the 2020 NFL Draft. In his first game with the Cardinals, Drake posted 110 rushing yards with a touchdown against the San Francisco 49ers in Week 9 as the Cardinals lost 25–28. In Week 15 against the Cleveland Browns, Drake rushed 22 times for 137 yards and four touchdowns during the 38–24 win. During Week 16 against the Seattle Seahawks, Drake rushed 24 times for 166 yards and two touchdowns, including an 80-yard touchdown, as the Cardinals won 27–13. Overall, in the 2019 season, Drake recorded 817 rushing yards and eight rushing touchdowns to  go along with 50 receptions for 345 receiving yards.

2020 season

The Cardinals placed the transition tag on Drake on March 16, 2020. He signed the tender for one-year, $8.483 million on March 27, 2020.

In Week 1 against the San Francisco 49ers, Drake rushed for 60 yards and his first rushing touchdown of the season during the 24–20 win. In Week 6 against the Dallas Cowboys, he had 20 carries for 164 rushing yards and two rushing touchdowns in the 38–10 victory.
In Week 10 against the Buffalo Bills, Drake rushed for 100 yards during the 32–30 win which would later be referred to as Hail Murray. In Week 12, against the New England Patriots, he had 22 carries for 78 rushing yards and two rushing touchdowns in the 20–17 loss. Drake finished the 2020 season with 239 carries for 955 rushing yards and ten rushing touchdowns.

Las Vegas Raiders
On March 19, 2021, Drake signed a two-year, $14.5 million contract with the Las Vegas Raiders. He was placed on injured reserve on December 8 with a broken right ankle he suffered against the Washington Football Team in Week 13. Drake finished the 2021 season with 63 carries for 254 rushing yards and two rushing touchdowns to go along with 30 receptions for 291 receiving yards and one receiving touchdown.

On August 23, 2022, Drake was released by the Raiders.

Baltimore Ravens
On August 31, 2022, Drake signed with the Baltimore Ravens. In Week 6, against the New York Giants, Drake had 119 rushing yards and one rushing touchdown in the 24–20 loss. In Week 9 against the New Orleans Saints, Drake ran for 93 rushing yards and two rushing touchdowns in the 27-13 victory.

NFL career statistics

References

External links
 
Baltimore Ravens bio
Alabama Crimson Tide bio 
NFL Scouting Combine profile

1994 births
Living people
People from Powder Springs, Georgia
Sportspeople from Cobb County, Georgia
Players of American football from Georgia (U.S. state)
American football running backs
Alabama Crimson Tide football players
Miami Dolphins players
Arizona Cardinals players
Las Vegas Raiders players
Baltimore Ravens players